Raúl Alfredo Noriega Escobar (nicknamed "Pavo", born 4 January 1970 in Guayaquil) is a former Ecuadorian international football player who made 27 appearances for the Ecuador national team between 1988 and 1997. He played as a central defender.

Club career
Noriego played the majority of his club career with Barcelona Sporting Club in Ecuador, but he did have short spells with Boca Juniors of Argentina and Cúcuta Deportivo of Colombia.  On 24 January 2009, Noriega retired from professional football after a friendly match between Barcelona Sporting Club and Millonarios of Colombia.

International career

Honours
 
 Korea Cup: 1995

References

External links

1970 births
Living people
Sportspeople from Guayaquil
Association football defenders
Ecuadorian footballers
Ecuador international footballers
1993 Copa América players
1995 Copa América players
Barcelona S.C. footballers
Boca Juniors footballers
Cúcuta Deportivo footballers
C.D. Universidad Católica del Ecuador footballers
Ecuadorian expatriate footballers
Expatriate footballers in Argentina
Expatriate footballers in Colombia
Ecuadorian Serie A players
Argentine Primera División players